Red, Hot and Heavy is the first full-length studio album by the Danish hard rock/heavy metal band Pretty Maids. It was released in 1984 by CBS Records. The song "Night Danger" was used on the soundtrack for the horror film Demons (1985) by Lamberto Bava. Red, Hot and Heavy was ranked number 437 in Rock Hard magazine's The 500 Greatest Rock & Metal Albums of All Time in 2005.

Track listing

Personnel 
Ronnie Atkins – vocals
Ken Hammer – lead, rhythm and acoustic guitars
Rick Hanson – lead and rhythm guitars
Allan Delong – bass
Phil Moorhead – drums
Alan Owen – keyboards

Guest musicians
Billy Cross – lead guitar (track 10), lead introduction (track 8)
Tommy Hansen – organs (track 10)
Knud Lindhard – backing vocals (tracks 4, 5, 8, 10)

Other staff
Billy Cross – producer
Tommy Hansen – producer, Fairlight CMI programming, organ (track 10)

References 

1984 albums
Pretty Maids albums
Columbia Records albums